The Fiat 900T was a small van produced by the Italian automobile manufacturer Fiat between 1976 and 1985, replacing the similar Fiat 850T. It was sold in the UK as the Fiat Citivan.

It was available in a number of variants, including the 900E seven-seat minibus, and the 900E Amigo and Pandora camper vans.

Specifications

The 900T was powered by a rear-mounted, four-cylinder 903cc petrol engine, shared with the Fiat 127.

The van was fitted with drum brakes all around. The standard van's luggage compartment could hold .

Models
The 900E minibus was discontinued without a direct successor in 1981. Fiat kept producing the cargo versions until 1986, by which time Japanese microvans and trucks had taken over this market segment. Production continued at Zastava's Kragujevac plant until 1989-90. Zastava's 900 was available as a van (AK), pickup (F), double-cab pickup (AF), or minibus (AL).

Fiat did not produce pickups at the time so third-party coach builders, such as the well-known Zagato and Viotti and Satae Ghiae specialists like Fissore, Moretti, Orlandi, Vignale, and Coriascoe Pasino would purchase 900T vans from the Fiat factory and convert them into campers and pickups, similar to the versions by Volkswagen. These companies cut away the rear body, added panels as needed to complete the conversion, and then resprayed the original colour. 

Coriasco and Fissore stamped the rear of the body with their own vehicle identification number to the right of the original Fiat VIN, the numbers then being combined into a longer vehicle identification number on the title. The pickup version was very similar to the Volkswagen Combi, with raised rear bed, removable bed walls and large storage area accessible from either side underneath.

References

900T
Vans
Vehicles introduced in 1976
1970s cars
1980s cars
Rear-engined vehicles